Daava is a 1997 Indian Hindi action drama movie directed by Sunil Agnihotri and starring Naseeruddin Shah, Akshay Kumar, Raveena Tandon and Akshay Anand in lead roles.

Plot 

Inspector Arjun is an honest and diligent police officer. He has an older stepbrother named Bhishma, and a younger brother named Suraj. While Bhishma, the former army officer lives with their mother in the village, Arjun and Suraj live in the city. In the city, he meets Seema, a pickpocket, and falls in love with her. Suraj gets employed at a poultry farm, but finds out that this is just a front for drugs like cocaine. His attempts to get this information to the police and his brother are in vain, as he is captured by the owners of the poultry farm, who owe their allegiance to notorious gangster Dhaman Chamunda. When Dhaman learns about Suraj, he decides to teach Arjun and Bhishma a lesson – first by splitting them up over the property they own in the village, then by framing Bhishma for the death of Suraj. With anger and hostilities reigning high amongst the two remaining brothers, the Chamunda Brothers decide to take full advantage of this situation, and watch in glee as the two brothers go against each other, in a fight to the death. Bhishma and Arjun clear their misunderstandings, but when their stepmother is killed by the Chamunda Brothers, they unite and kill them one by one until eventually destroying their empire.

Cast
Naseeruddin Shah as Bhishma
Akshay Kumar as Inspector Arjun
Raveena Tandon as Seema
Akshay Anand as Suraj
Divya Dutta as Deepa
Mohan Joshi as Dhaman Chamunda
Tinnu Anand as Madan Chamunda
Rajendra Gupta as Chaggan Chamunda and Duplicate Lawyer
Goga Kapoor as Bihari Baadshah
Deepak Shirke as Anna
Asha Lata as Bhishma's step-mother of Arjun and Suraj.
Gufi Paintal as Mangal Singh (One Piece Kathyawaari Ghodo)
Anupam Shyam as Police Inspector (cameo)
Brahmachari as Havaldar Barood Singh
Gavin Packard as Dhaman's henchman

Soundtrack

References

External links 
 

1997 films
1990s Hindi-language films
Films scored by Jatin–Lalit
Indian action drama films
1990s action drama films
Indian films about revenge
1990s masala films
Films directed by Sunil Agnihotri
1997 drama films